The NSU Sharks Women's Softball team represents Nova Southeastern University in Davie, Florida. They currently compete in the Sunshine State Conference.

History
The NSU softball team is one of the most successful teams at the university.  They won 6 NAIA national championships while in the Florida Sun Conference. They have since moved up to the NCAA and Division II.  They are in the Sunshine State Conference and have not had the same success as when in the NAIA, but they have been improving each year. 2006, was the changing year for the team.  It was their first official season after their probationary years. In 2006, Head Coach Lesa Bonee’s fourth season at the helm of the Sharks, NSU began the year 5–0 before ending the year with a 22–28 overall record. NSU would finish the year in sixth place in the Sunshine State Conference, two spots better than the previous season. Junior utility player Katie Veltri starred for the Sharks, leading the team in batting average (.384), slugging percentage (.543), on-base percentage (.424), hits (58), RBI (31), doubles (13), home runs (3) and total bases (82). At season’s end, Veltri was named to the All-Sunshine State Conference Second Team, as well as the NFCA All-South Region Second Team. Junior 2B Callie Binkley was named an All-SSC Honorable Mention after hitting .314 with 30 RBI and 18 stolen bases. The Sharks went 8–16 in SSC play, including conference series victories over the University of Tampa and Florida Tech. Junior Adrian Tuttle was NSU’s workhorse in the pitcher’s circle, going 13–14 with a 3.03 ERA and a strikeout-to-walk ratio of 2.02. Freshmen Valen Eberhard, Tranell Mesa and Katie Pepper all made significant contributions for the Sharks, giving NSU Softball a solid foundation going into 2007.

Season by season results